The Saattu Neettolai is one of the sub-sections of Arul Nool. The author of the content is unknown. This contains the events which took place when Ayya Vaikundar was coming towards the Detchanam along the sea-shore after incarnating from the sea of Thiruchendur.

Ayyavazhi texts